Kuwait competed at the 1996 Summer Olympics in Atlanta, United States. 25 competitors, all men, took part in 16 events in 9 sports.

Athletics

Diving

Men's 3m Springboard
Ali Al-Hasan
 Preliminary Heat — 272.40 (→ did not advance, 33rd place)

Fencing

One fencer represented Kuwait in 1996.

Men's foil
 Abdul Muhsen Ali

Handball

Roster

 Abbas Al-Harbi
 Abdul Ridha Al-Boloushi
 Adel Al-Kahham
 Bandar Al-Shammari
 Ismael Shah Al-Zadah
 Khaldoun Al-Khashti
 Khaled Al-Mulla
 Mishal Al-Ali
 Naser Al-Otaibi
 Qaied Al-Adwani
 Salah Al-Marzouq
 Salem Al-Marzouq

Judo

Shooting

Swimming

Table tennis

Weightlifting

References

External links
Official Olympic Reports

Nations at the 1996 Summer Olympics
1996
Summer Olympics